Ashland County Airport  is a public-use airport in Ashland County, Ohio, United States. It is located three nautical miles (3.5 mi, 5.6 km) northeast of the central business district of the City of Ashland. It is included in the FAA's National Plan of Integrated Airport Systems for 2011–2015, which categorized it as a general aviation facility.

Facilities and aircraft 
It has one runway designated 1/19 with an asphalt surface measuring 3,502 by 75 feet (1,067 x 23 m).

For the 12-month period ending April 19, 2010, the airport had 49,240 aircraft operations, an average of 134 per day: 96% general aviation, 3% air taxi, and 1% military. At that time there were 37 aircraft based at this airport: 89% single-engine and 11% multi-engine.

References

External links 
 Aerial photo as of 22 April 1994 from USGS The National Map
 

Airports in Ohio
Buildings and structures in Ashland County, Ohio
Ohio
County government agencies in Ohio
Transportation in Ashland County, Ohio